Cotto is a surname. People with the surname include:

 Abner Cotto (born 1987), Puerto Rican professional boxer
Antonio Correa Cotto (1926–1952), Puerto Rican outlaw
Cisco Cotto (born 1975), American news anchor and pastor
Delilah Cotto, Puerto Rican actress, dancer and model
Edgar Aroldo Cotto Gonzalez, Guatemalan footballer
Henry Cotto (born 1961), American professional baseball player
José Juan Cotto (born 1977), Puerto Rican professional boxer
José Cotto (born 1977), Puerto Rican professional boxer
Miguel Cotto (born 1980), Puerto Rican professional boxer-(the Cotto boxers are brothers)
 Vir Cotto, a character from the Babylon 5 universe

See also
 Cotto (disambiguation)